Ruja Plamenova Ignatova (born 30 May 1980) is a Bulgarian-born German citizen and convicted fraudster. She is best known as the founder of a fraudulent cryptocurrency scheme known as OneCoin, which The Times has described as "one of the biggest scams in history". She is the subject of the 2019 BBC podcast series The Missing Cryptoqueen and the 2022 book of the same name.

Since 2017, Ignatova has been on the run from various international law enforcement agencies. In early 2019, she was charged in absentia by U.S. authorities for wire fraud, securities fraud and money laundering. She was added to the FBI Ten Most Wanted in June 2022.

Early life and education
Born in Ruse, Bulgaria, in 1980, to a Romani family. Ignatova emigrated to Germany with her family when she was ten years old, and spent part of her childhood in Schramberg in the state of Baden-Württemberg. Claims that she may have studied at University of Oxford in England give no details of college, course, or date of matriculation. In 2005, she earned a PhD in private international law from the University of Constance in Germany with the dissertation Art. 5 Nr. 1 EuGVO – Chancen und Perspektiven der Reform des Gerichtsstands am Erfüllungsort, which discusses lex causae in conflict of laws. She reportedly has also worked for McKinsey & Company.

Criminal activities
In 2012, she was convicted of fraud in Germany in connection with her and her father Plamen Ignatov's acquisition of a company that shortly afterwards was declared bankrupt in dubious circumstances; she was given a suspended sentence of 14 months' imprisonment.

In 2013, she was involved with a multi-level marketing scam called BigCoin. In 2014, she founded a pyramid scheme called OneCoin.

Investigation and disappearance 

On 25 October 2017 Ignatova disappeared after being tipped off about increasing police investigations about OneCoin. In 2019, her brother Konstantin Ignatov pleaded guilty to fraud and money laundering in connection with the scheme.

In 2022, prosecutors in Darmstadt, Germany confirmed an investigation of "a lawyer from Neu-Isenburg" for possible money laundering: the transfer of 7.69 million euros by Ignatova into one of her private accounts in 2016. In January 2022, police searched apartments and offices in Weilburg, Baden-Baden, Frankfurt am Main, Bad Homburg, Neu-Isenburg and Vaihingen. 

Afterward, the North Rhine-Westphalia Police and German Federal Criminal Police Office announced that Ignatova is sought for fraud charges. The Federal Criminal Police Office announced a €5,000 reward for information leading to an arrest. An Interpol Red Notice followed. This listing was reciprocated by Europol adding Ignatova to its 'most wanted' list; however, Deutsche Welle notes that the Europol listing was removed under unknown circumstances.

The Federal Bureau of Investigation added Ignatova to its Ten Most Wanted Fugitives list, and announced at a joint press conference with IRS Criminal Investigation and United States Attorney's Office Southern District of New York, offering a reward of up to $100,000 for information leading to her arrest. The FBI followed up with an episode of its podcast and YouTube series Inside the FBI devoted to Ignatova and the OneCoin case.

According to a report published by Bulgarian investigative reporting site Bird, Ignatova was murdered in November 2018 on the orders of a Bulgarian drug lord, Hristoforos Amanatidis, also known as "Taki". The alleged murderer, Hristo Hristov, who is also Bulgarian, is currently serving time in a Dutch prison for drug trafficking. According to the report, Ignatova was murdered aboard a yacht in the Ionian Sea, and her body was dismembered and cast overboard. The alleged motive for the murder was to conceal the drug lord's involvement in the OneCoin scam. The narco-boss is said currently to reside in Dubai, having evaded Bulgarian authorities.

Personal life
Ignatova was married to the German lawyer Bjorn Strehl, with whom she had a daughter in 2016.

See also
List of fugitives from justice who disappeared

References

External links
 
The Missing Crypto Queen at BBC Sounds

1980 births
Living people
People from Schramberg
People from Ruse, Bulgaria
Bulgarian emigrants to Germany
Bulgarian expatriates in Germany
Bulgarian people of Romani descent
Bulgarian fraudsters
German fraudsters
German people of Romani descent
FBI Ten Most Wanted Fugitives
Fugitives wanted by the United States
People associated with cryptocurrency
People charged with wire fraud
University of Konstanz alumni
21st-century Bulgarian criminals